Matsumiya is one of several Japanese surnames and can refer to:

Isao Matsumiya, Japanese politician
Takayuki Matsumiya, Japanese long-distance runner
Mia Matsumiya, American musician

Japanese-language surnames